The 2021–22 Holy Cross Crusaders men's ice hockey season was the 58th season of play for the program, the 24th at the Division I level, and the 19th season in the Atlantic Hockey conference. The Crusaders represented the College of the Holy Cross and were coached by Bill Riga, in his 1st season.

Season
Under their new head coach, the Crusaders started the season poorly, winning just one of their first ten matches. The offense slowly improved as the season went along, but Holy Cross couldn't keep the puck out of their own net, allowing at least 3 goals in fifteen of their eighteen games in the first half of the year. It was no coincidence that they won all three of those games.

The second half of the year was going much like the first and Holy Cross found itself mired in at the bottom of the Atlantic Hockey standings. Throughout January, the defense played much better but the team's scoring dried up. However, the Crusaders seemed to turn things around when the defeated the top team in the conference, American International, at the end of the month. In the final four weeks of the regular season, Holy Cross won nearly as many games as they had through the first four months. While they were too far back in the standings to move up, the late surge gave the team hope that they could advance in the postseason.

Holy Cross opened at Mercyhurst and outplayed the Lakers in both games. Unfortunately, while they outshot Mercyhurst 76–35, they lost both games 1–2.

Departures

Recruiting

Roster
As of August 31, 2021.

Standings

Schedule and results

|-
!colspan=12 style=";" | Exhibition

|-
!colspan=12 ! style=""; | 

|-
!colspan=12 style=";" | Regular Season

|-
!colspan=12 style=";" | 

|- align="center" bgcolor="#e0e0e0"
|colspan=12|Holy Cross Lost Series 0–2

Scoring statistics

Goaltending statistics

Rankings

Note: USCHO did not release a poll in week 24.

Awards and honors

References

2021–22
2021–22 Atlantic Hockey men's ice hockey season
2021–22 NCAA Division I men's ice hockey by team
2021 in sports in Massachusetts
2022 in sports in Massachusetts